The 1937–38 Washington Huskies men's basketball team represented the University of Washington for the  NCAA college basketball season. Led by eighteenth-year head coach Hec Edmundson, the Huskies were members of the Pacific Coast Conference and played their home games on campus at the UW Pavilion in Seattle, Washington.

This was the final season without an NCAA tournament and the last for Montana in PCC basketball. Washington went on a postseason barnstorming trip to Hawaii; unchallenged in seven games, they finished with a 29–7 record.

This was the first year of the National Invitation Tournament, which included only six teams.

References

External links
Sports Reference – Washington Huskies: 1937–38 basketball season
Washington Huskies men's basketball media guide (2009–10) – History

Washington Huskies men's basketball seasons
Washington Huskies
Washington
Washington